Cushman is a city in Independence County, Arkansas, United States. The population was 452 at the 2010 census.

Geography
Cushman is located at  (35.869346, -91.764695).

Transportation 
 Arkansas Highway 69

Demographics

As of the census of 2000, there were 461 people, 178 households, and 140 families residing in the town. The population density was 115.6 inhabitants per square mile (44.6/km2). The racial makeup of the town was 96.53% White, 1.08% Native American, and 2.39% from two or more races.  1.08% of the population were Hispanic or Latino of any race.

There were 178 households, out of which 35.4% had children under the age of 18 living with them, 66.3% were married couples living together, 11.8% had a female householder with no husband present, and 20.8% were non-families. 18.5% of all households were made up of individuals, and 6.7% had someone living alone who was 65 years of age or older.  The average household size was 2.59 and the average family size was 2.95.

In the town the population was spread out, with 25.8% under the age of 18, 7.2% from 18 to 24, 26.5% from 25 to 44, 31.0% from 45 to 64, and 9.5% who were 65 years of age or older.  The median age was 39 years. For every 100 females, there were 97.0 males.  For every 100 females age 18 and over, there were 94.3 males.

The median income for a household in the town was $25,000, and the median income for a family was $29,125. Males had a median income of $22,266 versus $16,625 for females. The per capita income for the town was $11,836.  About 15.1% of families and 20.8% of the population were below the poverty line, including 22.9% of those under age 18 and 29.2% of those age 65 or over.

Climate
The climate in this area is characterized by hot, humid summers and generally mild to cool winters.  According to the Köppen Climate Classification system, Cushman has a humid subtropical climate, abbreviated "Cfa" on climate maps.

Education
Batesville School District serves the community. Cushman School District consolidated into the Batesville district on July 1, 2009.

Notable people
 Harmon Dobson (1913–1967), co-founder of Whataburger, grew up in Cushman.
 Buck Weaver (1905–1967), college and professional football player, was born in Cushman.

References

Cities in Independence County, Arkansas
Cities in Arkansas